Brian Camelio is an American record producer, musician, entrepreneur, and founder of ArtistShare.

Camelio is considered one of the fathers of crowdfunding, and "a post-modern Ahmet Ertegun" according to Bloomberg News. He has been a speaker or panelist at the Judge Business School at Cambridge University, Midem, The Grammy Foundation at NARAS, ASCAP, NYU Law School, Pew Center for Arts & Heritage, The Songwriters hall of fame and The Future of Music Coalition.

He was a member of the core faculty of The New School for Jazz and Contemporary Music, an online Digital Marketing instructor for the Eastman School of Music and has been a columnist for All About Jazz since 2010.

Music career
Camelio, who grew up in Boston, began his music career at the age of 9 and continued to pursue music at Clark University as a composition major. After finishing his music degree at the University of Vermont with a concentration in orchestral composition, he spent 15 years as a professional touring musician, composer and producer according to Celebrity Access.

Since founding ArtistShare, he has produced seven releases for jazz guitarist and NEA Jazzmaster  Jim Hall including Hemispheres, the 2008 collaboration with Bill Frisell, and Conversations (2010) with Joey Baron as well as for New Orleans based songwriter Chip Wilson, and  composer Maria Schneider, .  He has also worked with Trey Anastasio, Phish, Barbara Feldon among others.

In March 2021, Brian received a Grammy® award for his work as producer on the album Data Lords by Maria Schneider.

Business career
After teaching himself computer programming, Camelio started his first internet business in 1998, an online fundraising portal for non-profit groups. The business was not a success but the lessons learned led him to projects geared more towards technology. Around this time he also authored and published college music theory textbook named Finale Made Easy.

In 2000 or 2001, Brian Camelio founded ArtistShare. ArtistShare is recognized as the world's first crowdfunding website for creative professionals.  It also operates as a record label and business model for creative artists, which enables them to fund their projects by allowing the general public to directly finance, watch the creative process, and in most cases gain access to extra material from an artist.  In 2004, the first ArtistShare release won a Grammy for "Best Large Jazz Ensemble Recording" and became the first album ever to win a Grammy that was not available in retail stores. This is the moment Camelio describes as being his most memorable industry experience.

In a 2004 study by Cathy Allison, a technology expert engaged by the Canadian Heritage’s Copyright Policy Branch "to capture a “snapshot” of current business models and technologies, and to contemplate possible future scenarios regarding the control and compensation for use of music", Camelio is quoted as saying: "ArtistShare is the only viable solution that I can see. With the advent of the latest technology, it is becoming increasingly clear that there needs to be a fundamental shift in how artists do business. That shift involves the expansion of the product offered and a completely different payment schedule. ArtistShare will provide the platform."

The Jazz Review stated in January 2011 that Camelio "now may be considered visionary for perceiving the direction that the distribution of musical recordings was headed in 2001."

In May 2013, ArtistShare partnered with Blue Note Records to form a collaboration titled 'Blue Note/ArtistShare'. The Blue Note/ArtistShare collaboration was forged by Brian Camelio, Bruce Lundvall, and Don Was, President of Blue Note Records.

Selected discography
1987:  "Generations" - Jon Gailmor (Bass, Guitar)
1997:  "Textures" - Jim Hall (Music Preparation)
1998:  "By Arrangement" - Jim Hall (Music Preparation)
2002:  "Trio of One" - Sean Harkness (Guitar, Composer)
2002:  "Initial Wisdom" - Scott Colley (Composer)
2004:  "Magic Meeting" - Jim Hall (Producer)
2005:  "Free Association" - Jim Hall and Geoffrey Keezer (Producer)
2008:  "Hemispheres" - Jim Hall and Bill Frisell (Producer)
2010:  "Conversations" - Jim Hall and Joey Baron (Producer)
2011:  "Living Alone And Loving It" (audio book) - Barbara Feldon (Producer)
2012:  "Live At Birdland" - Jim Hall (Producer)
2012:  "Jim Hall Live! - Vol. 2-4" - Jim Hall (Producer)
2013:  "Newport Jazz Gala!" - Dianne Reeves, Jason Moran, Anat Cohen, Bill Frisell, Edmar Castaneda, Ingrid Jensen, Lionel Loueke, Steve Wilson, and Lewis Nash (Producer)
2016: "Inspired" - John Abercrombie, Rale Micic, Peter Bernstein, Lage Lund (Producer)
2016: "Valse Hot" - Jim Hall and Red Mitchell (Producer)
2017: "With a song in my heart" - Jane Hall and Ed Bickert (Producer)
2018: "Stories and Occasional Lies" - Chip Wilson (Producer, Performer)
2020: "Data Lords" - Maria Schneider Orchestra (Producer)

Awards

Grammy Awards

Choc de l'année Awards (France)

Misc. Awards 
 Mayor's Peace Prize - Burlington, Vt. for orchestral composition - 1989 
 ASCAP Young Composer's Grant - 1986 
 VCA Grant - 1986

References

External links
 

1965 births
Living people
American male composers
20th-century American composers
American music industry executives
Record producers from Massachusetts
Guitarists from Massachusetts
American male guitarists
20th-century American guitarists
20th-century American male musicians